Dominic Reyes is a professional sleight of hand magician from England. He is a publisher and producer of magic in the UK. He appeared in the 2007 film Magicians. His clients include Her Majesty The Queen, Sony, Volvo, BMW, British Board of Film Classification and the Royal Navy.

Reyes is a member of The Magic Circle, International Brotherhood of Magicians and The Associated Wizards of the South.

Since 1999 Reyes has published 10 books and videos teaching magicians under the title The Merchant of Magic. His works are published  in the UK and US. He is noted for creating the routine 'Ninja Coins' where a Chinese style coin magically transforms into any coin that it touches.

Bibliography
 The Ninja Coins Routine (2006)
 Politics and Coin Magic  (1999)
 The Coin Purse - Collective Essays on Advanced Coin Magic (1999)
 The Classic Palm (2001)

Filmography

 Pressure (2006) Distributed by Murphys Magic Supplies 
 Gallerian Bend DVD (2007) Distributed by Murphys Magic Supplies 
 Labelled and Relabelled DVD (2008) - Effect by Ben Williams. Published by Dominic Reyes 
 Gallerian Bend DVD (2007)- Effect by Erik Castle
 Compression DVD (2007) - Effect by Daniel Lachman
 One Card Link DVD (2008) - Effect by Ben Williams

References

External links

English magicians
Living people
Year of birth missing (living people)